Voskhod is a rural locality (a settlement) in Ivanovskoye Rural Settlement, Kovrovsky District, Vladimir Oblast, Russia. The population was 304 as of 2010. There are 7 streets.

Geography 
Voskhod is located 46 km south of Kovrov (the district's administrative centre) by road. Otrub is the nearest rural locality.

References 

Rural localities in Kovrovsky District